John Arthur Hill (born October 23, 1977) is an American musical theater actor who is most well known for his role of Jason McConnell in the Off-Broadway run of Bare: A Pop Opera. He also developed a following on his former website "John Hill Online" with his videos entitled "Johnny and Kooks", comedic videos he made with his friend Katharine Leonard. The pair released a single on iTunes entitled "About You". He grew up in San Antonio, Texas and currently resides in Los Angeles, California where he is producing television programs.

Theatre
He has also appeared in the Broadway musicals Hairspray (original Broadway cast as Fender), and The Boy from Oz (original Broadway cast as Mark Herron). In The Boy from Oz he also understudied the roles of Greg and the lead role Peter Allen.  He never went on as Peter Allen.  In Hairspray  he also understudied the roles of Link Larkin and Corny Collins.  He did go on as Link Larkin.  He starred opposite Michael Arden and Jenna Leigh Green in the original Off-Broadway cast of Bare: A Pop Opera in the leading role of Jason. He was supposed to return to this role when the show was supposed to move to a new theatre after a few months of break, but the move never happened. A demo of 11 tracks from this production was recorded, but the remaining tracks were never recorded when the production never resumed. He did appear in the "Bare's Back Concert" after the show closed, which most of the cast returned to perform in concert.  He also appeared in But I'm A Cheerleader  (a musical adaptation of the movie of the same name) at the New York Musical Theatre Festival in 2005. In June 2006, he wrote and performed the solo show Skinny Corpse at The Duplex in Manhattan, directed by Ben Rimalower. He also took part in the mini-musical Prop 8: The Musical.

Work in television
In 2007, he produced an 8-part documentary MTV called Show Choir.  This program followed the real life choir "IMAGES" of Morgantown High School in Morgantown, West Virginia.  It followed the transformation of the choir and its members.

He has also served as producer for the Nickelodeon reality show Dance on Sunset, Tori and Dean, All About Aubrey, Project Runway, Top Chef, and G4's Attack of the Show. 
He was the co-executive producer and writer, as well as an on-camera panelist/pundit on the short-lived Bravo show The Approval Matrix based on the popular feature in New York Magazine. In 2011 Hill accepted the role of executive producer of The A-List: Dallas, a spinoff of the popular LOGO hit. He is currently a producer on Watch What Happens Live with Andy Cohen and host of The Feels on Radio Andy, Andy Cohen’s Sirius XM Channel. He also writes for Love Connection on FOX where Cohen serves as host.

Personal life
Hill is gay. He was previously in a relationship with his Radio Andy costar Andy Cohen.

Recordings
 Single: About You by "Johnny and Kooks" (available on iTunes)
 Hairspray (2002 album) as Fender
 The Boy from Oz original Broadway cast as Mark Herron
 Bare: A Pop Opera original cast recording (never completed, a demo of a few songs was released)
 But I'm A Cheerleader demo recording

References

External links
 
 
 The official Johnny and Kooks website
 John Hill profile at Broadwayworld.com

20th-century American LGBT people
21st-century American LGBT people
1978 births
Living people
American male musical theatre actors
American gay actors
American gay musicians